The 1916 Miami Redskins football team was an American football team that represented Miami University as a member of the Ohio Athletic Conference (OAC) during the 1916 college football season. In its first season under head coach George Little, Miami compiled a 7–0–1 record (6–0–1 against conference opponents), shut out six of eight opponents, and won the OAC championship.  

The season was part of a 27-game unbeaten streak that began in November 1915 and ended in October 1919.

Schedule

References

Miami
Miami RedHawks football seasons
College football undefeated seasons
Miami Redskins football